Gloomy can refer to:

melancholia
The song Gloomy Sunday
The song Gloomy from the self-titled album Creedence Clearwater Revival
The Gloomy Dean, nickname of William Ralph Inge
Gloomy Bear, a fictional character 
Gloomy Galleon
Someone who is easily saddened or depressed